Goswin Anne-Marie Félix de Fierlant (ca. 1735—1804) was a holder of high office in the Austrian Netherlands who served on the Council of State, as the last president of the Great Council, and briefly as Chief President of the Privy Council of the Habsburg Netherlands.

Life
Goswin de Fierlant was born around 1735 to Guillaume de Fierlant, schout of Turnhout,  and Anne-Catherine van den Broeck. He began his public career with the city council of Brussels. In 1768 he was appointed secretary to the Privy Council of the Habsburg Netherlands, and the following year became a privy councillor himself. On 28 August 1771 he married Marie-Thérèse de Nény, eldest daughter of Patrice de Nény, chief president of the Privy Council.

By letters patent of 26 December 1773, Fierlant was appointed president of the Great Council, and the following January he was also made a Councillor of State. In 1787, during the reforms of Joseph II, he was transferred to Brussels as head of a new Council of Appeal, but when this project was abandoned he was reinstated as president of the Great Council, retaining the position throughout the political changes of the Brabant Revolution (1788—1793). In 1793, at the second Austrian restoration, he was appointed Chief President of the Privy Council. His career ended with the French invasion of 1794. He died in Brussels on 19 February 1804.

References

1730s births
1804 deaths
Presidents of the Great Council
People from Turnhout